The 1891–92 season was Stoke's third season in the Football League.

Stoke returned to the Football League after a season in the Football Alliance. Stoke continued to struggle in the more demanding competition and finished in 13th position with 14 points and had to seek re-election for the third time, they were successful in doing gaining more votes than Darwen and Sheffield United.

Season review

League
Prior to the start of the season Stoke had to ditch their traditional red and white striped kit due to the Football League ruling that only one style of kit can be used by one club and Sunderland were allowed to use red and white. Stoke used amber and black which changed to plain maroon coloured shirts, it took until the 1910s before Stoke could use red and white stripes on a regular basis. The rule was eventually scrapped in 1919.

For the 1891–92 season the Football League was increased from 12 to 14 clubs, Stoke along with Darwen joined the Football League. Despite a bright enough start, Stoke winning 2–1 at home to Derby County, there was a lack of improvement in their overall form and the team quickly dropped down the table. A 9–3 defeat at Darwen, who eventually finished bottom of the league and failed to be re-elected, was the most disappointing performance of a dismal campaign, although Stoke did win 5–1 in the return fixture. Goalkeeper Bill Rowley had now returned from injury and was captain of the side, while Arthur Reeves replaced Joseph Bradshaw as manager in January 1892. Re-election was again sought and duly achieved beating Sheffield United by one vote. They instead joined the newly formed Second Division for the 1892–93 season. Left-winger Joe Schofield made his debut for Stoke against Burnley on 10 October 1891. Schofield would go on to become one of Stoke's greatest players of the 1890s and earned a reputation as a goalscoring winger and he later managed the club during World War I.

FA Cup
After beating amateur side Casuals 3–0 (twice, after the first match was declared void due to icy pitch) and Burnley 3–1, Stoke drew 2–2 with Sunderland to set up Stoke's first cup replay which they lost 4–0.

Final league table

Results

Stoke's score comes first

Legend

Football League

FA Cup

Squad statistics

References

Stoke City F.C. seasons
Stoke